Onn Abu Bakar is a Malaysian politician who has served as the Member of Parliament (MP) for Batu Pahat since November 2022. He is a member of People's Justice Party (PKR), a component party of Pakatan Harapan (PH).

Election result

References

21st-century Malaysian politicians
People from Johor
Members of the 15th Malaysian Parliament
Living people
People's Justice Party (Malaysia) politicians
Year of birth missing (living people)